Yordan Tsitsonkov (1900  – 23 January 1926) was a Bulgarian revolutionary from Macedonia and activist of the Internal Macedonian Revolutionary Organization (IMRO), who assassinated the exiled Bulgarian politician Rayko Daskalov on 26 August 1923.

Biography
Born in 1900, Tsitsonkov originates from Štip, which at this time was part of the Ottoman Empire. During and after the Balkan Wars the control of the region changed repeatedly between the Kingdom of Serbia (later the Kingdom of Serbs, Croats and Slovenes) and the Tsardom of Bulgaria, while nowadays it is part of the Republic of North Macedonia. As most of the Slavic population of Macedonia until the early-20th century, the Tsitsonkov's self-identified ethnicity was Bulgarian.

He joined the Internal Macedonian Revolutionary Organization, an insurrectionary movement for liberation of Macedonia from Yugoslav occupation, at an early age. The IMRO was in heavy opposition to the Bulgarian prime minister Aleksandar Stamboliyski who wanted to establish a closer bilateral friendship with Yugoslavia. In March 1922 he was given the task of assassinating Rayko Daskalov, a fierce opponent of the IMRO, who held a number of posts in Stamboliyski's Bulgarian Agrarian National Union (BANU) government and commanded the paramilitary Orange Guard. Daskalov would face an attempt on his life by the IMRO on 15 December 1922 by the komitadji Asen Daskalov, who threw a bomb at Daskalov's car in Sofia. He escaped unharmed.

In March 1923 Stamboliyski signed the Treaty of Niš, which obliged the Tsardom of Bulgaria to suppress the operations of the IMRO carried out from Bulgarian territory. This event caused an intensification of IMRO actions against the BANU government, which eventually would spell its end. Rayko Daskalov had left his ministries in February, and in May he arrived in the Czechoslovak capital of Prague as Bulgaria's envoy to the country. The same month vojvoda Pancho Mikhailov (1891–1925) gave Tsitsonkov a fake passport with the name "Atanas Nikolov", a revolver, and a large sum of money. The young man was sent to Czechoslovakia, to complete his mission. 
The order had been authorized by the IMRO leader Todor Aleksandrov.

On 9 June, the BANU government was ousted by a right-wing political alliance and the Bulgarian military in a coup d'état. The IMRO aided the coup. Stamboliyski himself was captured while attempting to organize a peasant resistance, and was brutally tortured and executed by the IMRO. The rest of his government likewise collapsed, leaving Daskalov in Prague to form a government-in-exile and attempt to create foreign pressure against the new government of Aleksandar Tsankov.

On 26 August 1923, Tsitsonkov approached Daskalov on Holeček Street in the Smíchov district of Prague, and killed him with three shots. He was immediately arrested. The IMRO took responsibility for defending him, and hired the well-known Czech nationalist lawyer Jan Renner and the famous painter Professor Ivan Mrkvička to speak in his defence. He was released not long afterwards, after during a 13–14 November Prague trial the jury sentenced him to only 48 hours in jail, with 8 votes against 4, under the argument that he had not acted on behalf of the Tsankov government, and had committed the deed under pressure from death threats by the IMRO.

Strong Serbian diplomatic pressure however forced a re-trial, which took place between 22 and 27 October 1924 in Tábor. Although the prosecution again tried and failed to prove a connection to the Democratic Alliance and Tsankov, Tsitsonkov was sentenced to 20 years in prison this time around, which were to be spent in Tábor prison. After the authorities received information that he was planning an escape he was transferred to the maximum security prison Kartouzi in Ichin. There he took his own life on 23 January 1926, by hanging.

Today, a bilingual Czech–Bulgarian commemorative plaque marks the site of Daskalov's assassination in Smíchov, Prague. The plaque describes Daskalov as a "great Slav and a fighter for freedom, democracy and republicanism".

See also
Internal Macedonian Revolutionary Organization

References

1900 births
1926 suicides
Bulgarian assassins
Bulgarian people imprisoned abroad
Bulgarian people who died in prison custody
Macedonian Bulgarians
Members of the Internal Macedonian Revolutionary Organization
Bulgarian nationalist assassins
Suicides by hanging in Czechoslovakia
People convicted of murder by Czechoslovakia
People from Štip
People who committed suicide in prison custody
Prisoners who died in Czechoslovak detention
1926 deaths